Bruce East was a federal electoral district in Ontario, Canada, that was represented in the House of Commons of Canada from 1882 to 1904. This riding was created in 1882 from parts of Bruce North and Bruce South ridings.

The East Riding of the county of Bruce consisted of the townships of Culross, Greenock, Brant and Carrick, the town of Walkerton, and the village of Teeswater.

The electoral district was abolished in 1903 when it was redistributed between Bruce North and Bruce South ridings.

Election results

|}

|}

On Mr. Cargill's resignation, as he was already holding a Crown appointment (postmaster), and on his resignation as postmaster:

|}

|}

On Mr. Truax being unseated:

|}

|}

|}

On Mr. Cargill's death, 1 October 1903:

|}

See also 

 List of Canadian federal electoral districts
 Past Canadian electoral districts

External links 
Riding history from the Library of Parliament

Former federal electoral districts of Ontario